This is a list of the 81 members of the current convocation of the Parliament of Montenegro. The current convocation of the Parliament was elected in the 2020 parliamentary election, and is set to meet for the first time on 23 September 2020.

List of elected Members of the Parliament

Democratic Party of Socialists  
 Duško Marković (DPS)
 Branimir Gvozdenović (DPS)
 Milutin Simović (DPS)
 Aleksandra Vuković (DPS)
 Mevludin Nuhodžić (DPS)
 Predrag Bošković (DPS)
 Ivan Vuković (DPS)
 Gordana Đurović (DPS)
 Jevto Eraković (DPS)
 Nikola Rakočević (DPS)
 Andrija Popović (LPCG)
 Dragica Sekulić (DPS)
 Petar Ivanović (DPS)
 Halil Duković (DPS)
 Dragutin Papović (DPS)
 Marta Šćepanović (DPS)
 Vlastimir Golubović (DPS)
 Zoran Pažin (Ind.)
 Časlav Vešović (DPS)
 Vesna Pavićević (DPS)
 Miloš Nikolić (DPS)
 Miodrag Vuković (DPS)
 Nikola Janović (DPS)
 Daliborka Pejović (DPS)
 Branko Čavor (DPS)
 Bogdan Fatić (DPS)
 Danijel Živković (DPS)
 Suzana Pribilović (DPS)
 Ivan Mitrović (DPS)
 Abaz Dizdarević (DPS)

For the Future of Montenegro 
 Zdravko Krivokapić (Ind.)
 Nebojša Medojević (PzP)
 Marko Milačić (PCG)
 Simonida Kordić (NSD)
 Vladimir Joković (SNP)
 Maja Vukićević (DNP)
 Vladimir Dobričanin (UCG)
 Branko Radulović (PzP)
 Milun Zogović (DNP)
 Dragoslav Šćekić (SNP)
 Branka Bošnjak (PzP)
 Slaven Radunović (NSD)
 Strahinja Bulajić (NSD)
 Predrag Bulatović (DNP)
 Danijela Đurović (SNP)
 Milan Knežević (DNP)
 Vladan Raičević (PzP)
 Jovan Vučurović (NSD)
 Jelena Božović (NSD)
 Dragan Ivanović (SNP)
 Radoš Zečević (NSD)
 Marko Kovačević (NSD)
 Jovanka Bogavac (PzP)
 Dragan Bojović (DNP)
 Dragan Vukić (SNP)
 Milo Božović (NSD)
 Maksim Vučinić (RP)

Peace is Our Nation  
 Aleksa Bečić (DCG)
 Miodrag Lekić (Demos)
 Zdenka Popović (DCG)
 Dragan Krapović (DCG)
 Boris Bogdanović (DCG)
 Momo Koprivica (DCG)
 Stevan Katić (DCG)
 Tamara Vujovič (DCG)
 Albin Ćeman (DCG)
 Vladimir Martinović (DCG)

United Reform Action 
 Dritan Abazović (URA)
 Miloš Konatar (URA)
 Božena Jelušić (URA)
 Srđan Pavićević (CIVIS)

Social Democrats of Montenegro  
 Ivan Brajović (SD)
 Damir Šehović (SD)
 Boris Mugoša (SD)

Bosniak Party 
 Ervin Ibrahimović (BS)
 Amer Smailović (BS)
 Kenana Strujić Harbić (BS)

Social Democratic Party 
 Draginja Vuksanović (SDP)
 Raško Konjević (SDP)

Albanian List 
 Nik Gjeloshaj (AA)

Albanian Coalition – Unanimously 
 Fatmir Gjeka (DP)

References 

Politics of Montenegro
Montenegro politics-related lists